Plaza Fiesta San Agustín is one of the largest shopping malls in Mexico, and the largest located in the metropolitan area of Monterrey. Founded in 1988, it has grown to include shops and department stores dedicated to over 150 commercial activities.

It is administered by Inmobiliaria Real San Agustín, S.A.

Notable Attractions
 Three anchor stores including Sanborns, Soriana and Sears
 Numerous full service restaurants, banks, and clothing stores
 Government Offices
 Cinemex cinema multiplex
 Cinépolis VIP movie theater (Closed)
 Camino Real Monterrey

External links
Official Website

References

Shopping malls in Monterrey
Shopping malls established in 1988